Back to Babylon may refer to:

 Back to Babylon (album), an album by the band Tormé
 Back to Babylon (film), a 2002 documentary film